Brazil sent a team of 225 athletes to compete in the 2013 Summer Universiade held in Kazan, Russia from July 6 to 17, 2013.

Medalists

Athletics

Men
Track & road events

Field events

Women
Field events

Key
Note–Ranks given for track events are within the athlete's heat only
Q = Qualified for the next round
q = Qualified for the next round as a fastest loser or, in field events, by position without achieving the qualifying target
NR = National record
N/A = Round not applicable for the event
Bye = Athlete not required to compete in round
NM = No mark

Badminton

Men

Women

Mixed

Basketball

Both Brazil's men and women basketball teams are qualified for the events.

Men's tournament

Group D

|}

Quarterfinals

5th–8th place

7th place game

Women's tournament

Group B

|}

9th–16th place

9th–12th place

11th place game

Diving

Men

Fencing

Men

Women

Football

Both Brazil's men and women football teams are qualified for the events.

Men's tournament

Pool D

9th–16th place

13th place game

Women's tournament

Pool C

Quarterfinals

Semifinals

Bronze medal match

Gymnastics

Artistic

Men
Team

Individual

Judo

Men

Women

Rowing

Men

Men

Rugby sevens

Men

Group D

Women

Group B

Tennis

Men

Women

Mixed

Volleyball

Brazil has qualified both teams for the competition.

Men

Group C

|}

|}

Woman

Group B

|}

|}

Waterpolo

Men

Group B

Quarterfinals

5th–8th place

7th place game

Nations at the 2013 Summer Universiade
2013 in Brazilian sport
2013